Neanthophylax mirificus is the species of the Lepturinae subfamily in long-horned beetle family. This beetle is distributed in United States, and on Costa Rica island.

References

Lepturinae
Beetles described in 1865